The annual U.S. Open is the oldest currently running table tennis tournament in the United States. It attracts over 600 athletes annually.  The first events were actually run by either the New York Table Tennis Club or the American Ping Pong Association.  The first USA Table Tennis (USTTA) tournament was held in 1934.

The U.S. Open has been previously held in various locations, including Anaheim, California; Charlotte, North Carolina; ; Las Vegas, Nevada; Fort Lauderdale, Florida; Grand Rapids, Michigan; and Milwaukee, Wisconsin. 

Due to its international nature, most events are played under International Table Tennis Federation (ITTF) rules and at times the tournament has been included as an ITTF Pro Tour / World Tour event.

List of champions

gray = Not Played 
white = results not known or yet researched 
∗ The Mixed Doubles played at the 2003 U.S. Open was a delayed closed event.  See the 2002 U.S. Nationals results below.

References

Recurring sporting events established in 1931
ITTF World Tour
Table tennis competitions in the United States
1931 establishments in the United States